Pakkadmane Hudugi is a 2004 Indian Kannada-language romantic comedy film directed by M. S. Rajashekar, starring Raghavendra Rajkumar and Ranjitha. It is a remake of the Hindi film Padosan (1968) which in turn was based on the Bengali film Pasher Bari (1952).

Cast 
Raghavendra Rajkumar as Balu
Ranjitha as Indu
Anant Nag as Chakravarthy
Mohan as Indu's music teacher

Production 
This film marks the return of Raghavendra Rajkumar to acting after five years. A song was shot at M G Road, Bangalore.

Soundtrack 
Music by Rajesh Ramanath. Three songs were reused from Padosan.

Reception 
SND of Deccan Herald wrote that "The director has followed the original story idea. His efforts to make this film lively as far as possible is clearly visible particularly in the first half which is mainly comedy". RGV of Nowrunning wrote that "In the end, Pakkadmane Hudugi turns out to be yet another Kannada film that fails to make any impact".

References

External links 
 
Ranjitha on Chitraloka
Mohan on Chitraloka

2000s Kannada-language films
2004 romantic comedy films
Indian romantic comedy films
Kannada remakes of Hindi films